Samara Time (SAMT) is the time zone 4 hours ahead of UTC (UTC+04:00) and 1 hour ahead of Moscow Time (MSK+1). Samara Time is used in Samara Oblast, Udmurtia, Astrakhan Oblast, Ulyanovsk Oblast and Saratov Oblast.

History 
Until a reform on 28 March 2010, Samara Time was UTC+04:00 in winter and Samara Summer Time (SAMST) was UTC+05:00 in summer. From that date, Samara Time was abolished with the two regions effectively joining Moscow Summer Time.  In March 2011, Moscow time was moved forward to UTC+04:00 year-round, and Samara Time was reinstated on 26 October 2014, when Moscow time moved back one hour to UTC+03:00 year-round and Samara Oblast and Udmurtia remained on UTC+04:00.
On 27 March 2016, Ulyanovsk Oblast and Astrakhan Oblast switched to Samara Time by moving the clock 1 hour forwards from Moscow time. On 4 December 2016, Saratov Oblast also switched to Samara Time by moving forward 1 hour from Moscow time.  On 28 October 2018, Volgograd Oblast also switched to Samara Time by moving forward 1 hour from Moscow time, but this change was reverted on 27 December 2020.

References 

Time zones
Time in Russia